The Sixteenth Legislative Assembly of Uttar Pradesh (a.k.a. Sixteenth Vidhan Sabha of Uttar Pradesh) was constituted on 15 March 2012 as a result of 2012 Uttar Pradesh Legislative Assembly election held between 8 Feb to 3 March 2012. The Sixteenth Legislative Assembly has total of 404 MLAs (including one nominated Anglo-Indian member) against a total strength of 404 members.

Important members

Party wise strength

Electors

Candidates

List of constituencies and elected members
Default sort, in alphabetical order of constituency. All members were elected in Mar 2012 and following list might undergo further changes due by-elections.

See also

 First Legislative Assembly of Uttar Pradesh
 Government of Uttar Pradesh
 List of Chief Ministers of Uttar Pradesh
 Politics of India
 Uttar Pradesh Legislative Assembly
 2012 Uttar Pradesh Legislative Assembly election
 Vidhan Bhawan

Notes
  Strength as of 19 May 2016. MLA strength changed due candidates vacating their post after getting elected into 16th Lok Sabha or death of sitting members, and the subsequent by-elections held.
  ID is the Constituency identification number assigned during "Delimitation of Parliamentary and Assembly Constituencies Order, 2008".
  LS constituency is the corresponding Lok Sabha constituency for the Assembly constituency.

References

External links
 http://www.huffingtonpost.in/2017/01/10/nearly-60-of-uttar-pradesh-mlas-didnt-ask-a-single-question-in/

Indian politics articles by importance
Uttar Pradesh Legislative Assembly